J. G. Irmler was a piano manufacturer in Leipzig, Saxony.

The owners Emil and Otto Irmler were awarded an Imperial and Royal Warrant of Appointment to the court of Austria-Hungary.

References

External links 
 Irmler Square Piano (Leipzig, ca. 1855)

Manufacturing companies based in Leipzig
Piano manufacturing companies of Germany
Purveyors to the Imperial and Royal Court
Music in Leipzig